The 2011–12 Biathlon World Cup – World Cup 7 was held in Holmenkollen, Oslo, Norway, from 2 February until 5 February 2012.

Schedule of events

Medal winners

Men

Women

Achievements

 Best performance for all time

 , 1st place in Sprint
 , 9th place in Sprint
 , 27th place in Sprint
 , 38th place in Sprint and 32nd in Pursuit
 , 71st place in Sprint
 , 82nd place in Sprint
 , 86th place in Sprint
 , 87th place in Sprint
 , 88th place in Sprint
 , 4th place in Mass Start
 , 17th place in Sprint
 , 20th place in Sprint and 14th in Pursuit
 , 26th place in Sprint
 , 33rd place in Sprint
 , 45th place in Sprint
 , 52nd place in Sprint
 , 58th place in Sprint
 , 68th place in Sprint
 , 74th place in Sprint
 , 15th place in Pursuit
 , 38th place in Pursuit

 First World Cup race

 , 49th place in Sprint
 , 79th place in Sprint
 , 80th place in Sprint
 , 89th place in Sprint
 , 66th place in Sprint
 , 67th place in Sprint
 , 71st place in Sprint
 , 73rd place in Sprint

References 

- World Cup 7, 2011-12 Biathlon World Cup
Biathlon World Cup - World Cup 7, 2011-12
February 2012 sports events in Europe
International sports competitions in Oslo
2010s in Oslo
Biathlon competitions in Norway